Calvin Marshall is a 2009 coming of age-comedy film written and directed by Gary Lundgren and starring Alex Frost as the title character, a determined but talentless college baseball player, and Steve Zahn as his coach. After two years of raising funds, the film was shot in and around Ashland and Medford, Oregon in November–December 2007, and was released in 2009.

Plot
Calvin Marshall is a charismatic student at Bayford City College. When he tries out for the baseball team for the third straight year, ex-minor leaguer Coach Little is exasperated by Calvin's persistence despite Marshall's lack of baseball skills. Determined to make the team, Calvin wins Little over with pure heart and love of the game.

While rehabilitating during an injury, Calvin announces games for the Lady Bisons volleyball team and is entranced by their star, Tori. Preoccupied with caring for her sick mother and more interested with meaningless flings, Tori is unsure what to make of Calvin's advances.

Cast
 Alex Frost as Calvin Marshall
 Steve Zahn as Coach Doug Little
 Jeremy Sumpter as Caselli
 Michelle Lombardo as Tori Jensen
 Cynthia Watros as Karen
 Andrew Wilson as Ernie
 Jane Adams as June Marshall
 Abraham Benrubi as Coach Dewey  
 Josh Fadem as Simon
 Rosie Thomas as Sondra
 Diedrich Bader as Fred Deerfield
 Darwin Barney as Murphy

Production
Production company Broken Sky Films was started by Gary Lundgren, Anne Lundgren, Michael Matondi, and Mark Cunningham in 2000, and its first production was Gary Lundgren's short film "Wow and Flutter". Cunningham had planned to fund Calvin Marshall, but did not have the money to create the company's first full-length feature film. They hired a casting director, Christine Sheaks, who successfully sought out Steve Zahn for the part of Coach Little. Over the two years it took to raise enough money, a number of financiers pulled out but Zahn's promised participation attracted further sponsorship.

Calvin Marshall began filming on November 11, 2007 in Ashland, Oregon. Line producer Gary Kout said that Ashland was chosen as a filming location because "the setting of the film [is] fictitious and Ashland has a timeless feel to it and creates a beautiful backdrop." The Lady Bisons volleyball scenes were filmed at Southern Oregon University's McNeal Pavilion and gymnasium, with around 200 extras standing in as supporters in the stands. North Mountain Park's softball fields were used for several of the scenes in the film. Other locations included city streets and local homes in Ashland, the Whiskey River Cafe and Lounge in Central Point and the Rogue Valley Family Fun Center in Central Point; between US$400,000 and $500,000 was spent on filming permits for public places. Production moved to Medford, Oregon where locations included the Harry and David Baseball Park. Principal photography concluded on December 15, 2007.

Release
Calvin Marshall premiered at the Austin Film Festival in October 2009.

Awards
David Raines, Mark Server, and Kent Romney were nominated for "Outstanding Achievement in Sound Mixing, DVD Original Programming" for Calvin Marshall at the Cinema Audio Society Awards in 2011.

References

External links

 
 
 
 

2009 films
2000s coming-of-age comedy-drama films
American coming-of-age comedy-drama films
Films shot in Oregon
American independent films
2009 independent films
2000s English-language films
2000s American films